This is a timeline of the history of rugby union on television in the UK.

1960s

 1966
1 January – The first edition of Rugby Special is broadcast, showing weekly highlights of rugby union matches.

 1967
 No events.

  1968
 No events.

 1969
 No events.

1970s
No events.

1980s 
 1980 to 1984
 No events.

 1985
 13 October – Rugby Special moves to Sunday afternoons. Previously the programme had been shown on Saturday evenings.

 1986
 Autumn – The BBC launches regional versions of  Rugby Special so that each nation can receiver fuller coverage of games from their country.

 1987
 22 May-20 June – The BBC shows mostly recorded coverage of the first Rugby World Cup. This is the only time the BBC has ever shown the competition – ITV has held the rights ever since.

 1988
 No events

 1989
 23 July –  The BBC broadcasts what was to be its final coverage of the British & Irish Lions when it shows live coverage of the final test match of the Lions’ 1989 British Lions tour to Australia.

1990s 
 1990
 No events.

 1991
 3 October–2 November – ITV shows full live coverage of the 1991 Rugby World Cup, beginning a relationship with the tournament which lasts to this day.

 1992
 No events.

 1993
 16–18 April – Following the successful showing of the 1991 World Cup, ITV broadcasts full, live coverage of the 1993 Rugby World Cup Sevens. ITV also shows the 1997 event, but mostly on a pre-recorded basis due to time zone issues.
 22 May-3 July – ITV broadcasts live coverage of the 1993 British Lions tour to New Zealand. 

 1994
 11 May-11 June – ITV shows live coverage of the 1994 England rugby union tour of South Africa. In addition to showing the two test matches, ITV also broadcasts live coverage of all the tour matches. ITV also broadcast highlights of the other home countries' tour matches taking place in 1994. It shows all of the tour matches live. This is the only time that ITV broadcasts an English rugby tour.
 30 October – Sportscene Rugby Special launches on  BBC Scotland's to cover Scottish rugby union with the live matches & highlights broadcasting on BBC Two Scotland on Sunday teatimes. 

 1995
 10 September – BBC Wales launches a new rugby union programme, Scrum V. It replaces Rugby Special Wales.
 September – Sky begins showing a weekly game from the top division of England club rugby. This is the first time that a live match from domestic rugby union had been shown in the UK.
 ITV broadcasts some coverage of the inaugrial Heineken Cup

 1996
 November – Sky Sports begins showing live coverage of  England national rugby union team’s autumn internationals, replacing the BBC which held the right for many decades.

 1997
April - BBC Wales lose their share of the rights to domestic Welsh club rugby, as the Welsh Rugby Union agrees a new 4 year deal with HTV Wales (who showed games previously in midweek), and S4C. The deal sees S4C show a live game every Saturday night, HTV Wales Sunday highlights on a new programme "The front Row". HTV wales also allowed to show 4 live League matches, and 4 live cup matches (not including the cup final) live a season. The deal ends in 2001 when HTV Wales declined to tender again for the rights.
 May–July – Sky Sports takes over as broadcaster of the British and Irish Lions when it shows full live coverage of the 1997 British Lions tour to South Africa. In addition to the test matches, Sky also broadcasts live coverage of the tour matches.
31 May – Even though Channel 5 had said that it hadn't been intending to show live sport at peak time, it buys the rights to one of England's qualifying matches for the 1998 World Cup and two international games of England's rugby union tour of Argentina.

 1998
 February – For the first time, the BBC does not show England's matches in the Five Nations Championships. Live coverage is on Sky Sports and highlights are on ITV.

 1999
 October – The BBC takes over as broadcaster of the Heineken Cup although it had shown some action from the tournament in some parts of the Uk for the previous cripple of seasons.

2000s 
 2000
 Channel 5 broadcasts weekly highlights of the Aviva Premiership, and does so for just one season.

 2001
May - The four year deal between HTV Wales and S4C for the coverage of Welsh domestic club rugby ends. HTV Wales elects not to tender for the new deal, and BBC Wales and S4C take over, with the new deal giving each channel a live game each weekend, thus two live matches a weekend. BBC Wales show theirs on a Friday night, S4C a Saturday night as per the previous deal.
 11 August – The ITV Sport Channel launches. Although the channel is mostly focussed on football it does show other sport, including the secondary rights to the Heineken Cup.

 2002
 February – The BBC once again holds the rights to the entire Six Nations Championship.

 2003
 22 October – Sky becomes the new broadcaster of rugby union's European clubs tournament Heineken Cup, replacing the BBC which had shown the tournament since the late 1990s.

 2004
 No events.

2005
 After nearly 40 years on air, Rugby Special ends although it does return on an ad hoc basis a decade later.

 2006
 No events.

 2007
 No events.

 2008
 No events.

 2009
 30 July – ESPN announces that they will cover the French Top 14 live. In addition, ESPN broadcasts live international clashes featuring New Zealand, Samoa and South Africa.
 6 September – The first edition of Scottish television's rugby union programme STV Rugby is broadcast after a deal with the Celtic League Association, Scottish Rugby and STV was reached, following the closure of Setanta Sports in the UK.

2010s
2010
 16 July – ESPN begins showing the pre-season J.P. Morgan Asset Management Premiership Rugby 7s Series Series. The new tournament, which took place over July and August 2010, involves all 12 Premiership Rugby clubs competing in Friday evening games. The broadcaster also showed the 2011 and 2012 tournaments. BT Sport now shows this after the acquisition of ESPN by BT Sport.
 September – ESPN starts broadcasting live coverage of 43 matches per season from the English Premiership. The agreement also provides highlight rights for use on ESPN digital media such as ESPNScrum.com. Sky Sports will continue to show 26 live games per season plus the other semi-final.

2011
 No events.

2012
 17 August – Premier Sports buys the rights to the French Top 14 league, usually broadcasting two live games per round. It shows the league for just a single season. 
 September – BT wins the rights to Premiership Rugby and its associated 7s Series, and in November it picks up the rights to American, Brazilian, French and Italian top-flight football.

2013
 STV Rugby is broadcast for the final time.
 28-30 June – Sky Sports shows the 2013 Rugby World Cup Sevens with a one-hour review of the tournament shown later on ITV4.

2014
 No events.

2015
 July – The BBC and ITV join forces to stop Sky Sports from picking up live coverage of the Six Nations Championship. The two terrestrial broadcasts will share coverage of the event from 2017 onwards.
 September – S4C begins showing one live match from each round of the Pro 12. It had previously shown coverage in highlights form since the league's conception as the Celtic League in 2001.
 December – Coverage of The Varsity Match returns to free-to-air television as part of a new contract between the BBC and the RFU. 

2016
 September – BT Sport becomes the official UK broadcast partner of rugby union's European Champions and Challenge Cup competitions.
 November – Premier Sports begins broadcasting France's autumn internationals and in 2018 begins broadcasting Italy's autumn internationals

2017
 February – The BBC and ITV begin a five-year contract as joint broadcasters of the Six Nations Championship. They had joined forces to prevent the tournament being sold to pay television.
9-26 August – ITV and ITV4 show the 2017 Women's Rugby World Cup live with the final broadcast live on ITV.
 September – Channel 5 takes over from ITV as broadcaster of highlights of the  Premiership Rugby . The deal also sees five matches per season broadcast live by the channel. This is the first time that the league has been shown live on terrestrial TV. The also includes highlights of the Premiership Rugby Cup. 

2018
 The BBC's coverage of the PRO14 Rugby ends when the rights are sold to Premier Sports. The BBC had covered the competition since its inception in 2001. 
 12 May – Sky's coverage of the European Rugby Champions Cup ends after 15 years of coverage of the event when the rights to the tournament transfer to BT Sport. It also loses its coverage of the Pro14 competition to Premier Sports.
 2 June – Channel 4 shows live rugby union for the first time when it broadcasts live coverage of Wales' summer tour.
 31 August – Premier Sports takes over as broadcaster of the PRO14 Rugby. The agreement sees all 152 games per season broadcast live, with no less than 21 games (one per round) shown live free-to-air on FreeSports. Sky Sports and the BBC had been the previous broadcasters – the BBC had shown the tournament since its inception in 2001. The start of the contract sees Premier Sports launch a second channel – Premier Sports 2.
 October – Channel 4 expands its rugby union coverage when it begins showing one match from each round from the Heineken Cup. It also replaces Sky Sports as broadcaster of Ireland's Autumn internationals.

2019
 November – Coverage of The Varsity Match returns to ITV which shows both the men's and women's matches on ITV4.

2020s
 2020
 13 November – Channel 4 shows live and recorded coverage of rugby union's Autumn Nations Cup. Channel 4 shows live coverage of Ireland's matches and highlights of all other games.
 14 November – Amazon Prime Video broadcasts rugby union for the first time when it begins showing the Autumn Nations Cup. Ireland's matches are shown on Channel 4 and Wales' games are broadcast on S4C.

 2021
 3-24 April – The BBC is the exclusive broadcaster of the 2021 Women's Six Nations Championship. Previously the tournament had been shared between the BBC, and Sky Sports which had shown the England matches.
 28 May – Premier Sports begins showing coverage of French rugby union's top flight competition - Top 14.
 July-August – 
 Channel 4 broadcasts highlights of the three test matches of the 2021 British & Irish Lions tour to South Africa. This is the first time since 1993 that coverage of the British & Irish Lions has been shown on free-to-air television.
 Sky Sports Action is rebranded as Sky Sports The Lions. This channel is dedicated to coverage of the 2021 British & Irish Lions tour to South Africa and mixes live and recorded action of the current tour with Sky's coverage of previous tours.
 27 August – BBC Northern Ireland secures a three-year deal with Ulster's United Rugby Championship (URC) to screen home matches, and will air six games over the 2021–22 season.
 30 October – Amazon Prime Video begins showing almost all of the autumn international matches played by the six Nations countries. The only exception is Ireland's matches which are seen on Channel 4 although Ireland's games will move to Amazon in 2022.

 2022
 30 January – Premiership Rugby returns to ITV screens and the new deal sees ITV show a live match for the first time. ITV will show 12 live matches over the two years of the contract, including the Premiership Final, as well as a weekly highlights show in ITV4.
 18 June – The Premiership Final will be shown live on free-to-air television for the first time.
 October – ITV replaces Channel 4 as terrestrial broadcaster of the Heineken Cup. BT Sport continues as the pay television broadcaster of the tournament.
 9 December – Viaplay Sports takes over as rights holder of European Professional Club Rugby's second-tier competition the EPCR Challenge Cup. The European Rugby Champions Cup continues to be broadcast by BT Sport.

See also
 Timeline of BBC Sport
 Timeline of ITV Sport
 Timeline of sport on Channel 4
 Timeline of sport on Channel 5
 Timeline of Sky Sports
 Timeline of BT Sport
 Timeline of Viaplay Sports
 Timeline of other British sports channels

References

rugby union on UK television
rugby union on UK television
rugby union on UK television
Sports television in the United Kingdom
rugby union on UK television
Rugby union in England